James Marsh (April 26, 1946 – August 12, 2019) was an American professional basketball player who competed in the National Basketball Association (NBA) for one season. He played college basketball at the University of Southern California, and played professionally for the Portland Trail Blazers of the NBA.

After his playing career, Marsh spent time as an assistant coach at the University of Utah before transitioning to a career as a broadcaster for the Seattle SuperSonics, which is the franchise by whom he was drafted out of college. He served as the color commentator on SuperSonics television broadcasts for 12 years.

Marsh was diagnosed with Parkinson's disease in 2004. He had two adult daughters and lived in Kirkland, Washington, where he continued to coach an AAU basketball team. Marsh died on August 12, 2019.

References

1946 births
2019 deaths
American men's basketball players
Basketball players from Pasadena, California
Pasadena High School (California) alumni
People with Parkinson's disease
Portland Trail Blazers players
Seattle SuperSonics announcers
Seattle SuperSonics draft picks
Small forwards
Sportspeople from Pasadena, California
USC Trojans men's basketball players
Utah Utes men's basketball coaches